The Diocese of Western Tanganyika is a diocese in the Anglican Church of Tanzania: its current bishop is the Right Reverend Emanuel C. Bwatta.

Notes

Anglican Church of Tanzania dioceses
 
Anglican realignment dioceses